Mahur Berenji or Mahoor Berenji may refer to:
 Mahur Berenji-ye Olya
 Mahur Berenji-ye Sofla
 Mahur Berenji Rural District